The Catholic Church in Belarus is part of the worldwide Catholic Church, under the spiritual leadership of the Pope in Rome. The first Latin Rite diocese in Belarus was established in Turaŭ between 1008 and 1013. Catholicism was a traditionally dominant religion of Belarusian nobility (the szlachta) and of a large part of the population of West Belarus.

Description
As of 2015, there are 674,500 Catholics in the country, about 7.1% of the total population. Most of these belong to the Latin Rite dioceses. A small minority are of Byzantine Rite, forming the particular Belarusian Greek Catholic Church, which is in union with the Holy See and follows the Byzantine Slavonic ritual.

Polish and Lithuanian minorities in Belarus are predominantly  Latin-Rite Catholics. The Greek Catholics are mostly ethnic Belarusians, with some Ukrainians.

History
The first Latin Rite diocese in Belarus was established in Turaŭ between 1008 and 1013.

Catholicism was a traditionally dominant religion of Belarusian nobility (the szlachta) and of a large part of the population of western and northwestern parts of Belarus.

There was once an archbishopric in Polotsk. St. Josaphat Kuntsevych was archbishop from 1618 to 1623, succeeding another archbishop.

In August 2020, the leader of the Roman Catholic church in Belarus Tadevuš Kandrusievič was banned from returning to Belarus from Poland for several months after condemning violence during the mass protests. He was forced to resign soon after the return 5 months later. In July 2021, Alexander Lukashenko tried to intervene in the prayer schedule warning Catholic priests not to perform the religious song "The Almighty God". In September 2021, Minskaya Pravda (an official newspaper of Minsk Oblast) published a cartoon depicting Roman Catholic priests as Nazis wearing swastika instead of crosses.

See also
Belarusian Greek Catholic Church
Catholic Church by country
Religion in Belarus

References

External links
 The Catholic Church in Belarus - official website and the central Belarusian catholic web-portal
 The Apostolic Nuntiature in Belarus
 Partał Maładych Katalikoŭ - Young Catholics of Belarus

 
Belarus
Belarus